Yulianna Andreevna Avdeeva (born 3 July 1985) is a Russian concert classical pianist who has performed and recorded internationally.

Life and career 
Avdeeva was born in Moscow. She started piano lessons at the age of five, studied at the Gnessin Special School of Music in Moscow, and graduated from the Zurich University of the Arts. After her graduation, she became assistant to her teacher, Konstantin Scherbakov. From 2008, Avdeeva studied at the International Piano Academy Lake Como with Dmitri Bashkirov. In 2010, Avdeeva won First Prize in the XVI International Chopin Piano Competition. She is the fourth woman to have won this title, after Halina Czerny-Stefańska, Bella Davidovich (ex aequo in 1949) and Martha Argerich (1965).

During the COVID-19 pandemic, Avdeeva streamed weekly Bach podcasts to stay in touch with her audience.

On 5 July 2020, Avdeeva—together with Dmitry Masleev and Daniil Trifonov—livestreamed the premieres of several juvenilia and other unpublished piano works by Dmitri Shostakovich.

In the summer of 2021, she played several European festivals, following which she undertook a concert tour of Germany and Austria.

She has performed and toured with a wide variety of orchestras and toured with Julia Fischer and Gidon Kremer. She has also collaborated with cellist Sol Gabetta.

Awards

 2003 – 9th European Piano Contest Bremen – 2nd prize.
 2006 – 61st Geneva International Music Competition (Geneva) – 2nd prize.
 2007 – 7th International Ignacy Jan Paderewski Piano Competition (Bydgoszcz) – 2nd prize.
 2010 – XVI International Chopin Piano Competition (Warsaw) – 1st prize and best performance of a sonata

Discography
 2012: Chopin: Piano Concertos Nos. 1 & 2 with Orchestra of the 18th Century, Frans Brüggen (conductor) on 1849 Erard fortepiano 
 2014: Schubert: Drei Klavierstücke (Three Piano Pieces), D. 946; Prokofiev: Piano Sonata No. 7 in B-flat major, Op. 83; Chopin: 24 Préludes Op. 28 (Mirare 252, 2 CDs; distribution: Harmonia Mundi)
 2016: Mozart: Piano Sonata No. 6 in D major, K. 284; Chopin: Fantaisie in F minor, Op. 49; Liszt: Après une lecture du Dante - Fantasia quasi sonata; from Verdi's Aida'': Danza sacra e duetto finale, S. 436 (Mirare, 1 CD; distribution: Harmonia Mundi)

References

External links 

 

1985 births
Living people
Russian classical pianists
Russian women pianists
International Chopin Piano Competition winners
Women classical pianists
Jewish classical pianists
21st-century classical pianists
21st-century women pianists